Juan Alfon, born at Toledo, painted, in 1418, several altar-screens for the cathedral of that city, which are still preserved.

References
 

People from Toledo, Spain
Year of birth unknown
Year of death unknown
15th-century Spanish painters
Spanish male painters